Timothy Jahti White (born July 15, 1994) is a professional gridiron football wide receiver for the Hamilton Tiger-Cats of the Canadian Football League (CFL). He played college football at Arizona State.

Professional career

Baltimore Ravens
White signed with the Baltimore Ravens as an undrafted free agent on May 5, 2017. He was placed on injured reserve on September 1, 2017.

On September 1, 2018, White was waived by the Ravens and was signed to the practice squad the next day. He was promoted to the active roster on September 22, 2018. He was waived on October 8, 2018 and was re-signed to the practice squad.

New York Jets
On January 9, 2019, White signed a reserve/future contract with the New York Jets. He was waived on August 31, 2019.

New Orleans Saints
On December 30, 2019, White was signed to the New Orleans Saints practice squad. He signed a reserve/future contract with the Saints on January 7, 2020. He was waived on May 28, 2020.

Hamilton Tiger-Cats
White signed with the Hamilton Tiger-Cats of the CFL on March 12, 2021.

References

External links
Arizona State Sun Devils bio

1994 births
Living people
American football wide receivers
Arizona State Sun Devils football players
Baltimore Ravens players
Hamilton Tiger-Cats players
New Orleans Saints players
New York Jets players
Players of American football from California
Sportspeople from Santa Clarita, California